is the fifth album by Japanese experimental music band Boris. Originally released in 2003 on Diwphalanx Records with minimalist artwork, it was re-issued in 2005 on Southern Lord Records with a different cover and more music.

Releases
In addition to running an additional 7 minutes, the opening track of the Southern Lord version is a totally different take; both use the same riff from "Akuma no Uta," but the original, shorter track repeats it far less and opens with over a minute of ambient, resonant amp noise absent from the longer version. An edit of the long version opens 2010 compilation Boris / Variations + Live in Japan, closely resembling the running length of the original intro, but sourced from a different point halfway through the 9 minute version and with a fade in.

Music videos were made for the songs "Ibitsu" and "Furi" and can be found on the 2003 DVD Live at Shimokitazawa Shelter. In addition to a short edit of the opening track, an alternate take of "Naki Kyoku" appears on Variations; it and "Akuma no Uta" were also re-recorded with Merzbow in 2004, for their 2011 collaboration called Klatter. Another collaboration with Merzbow for the title track – though its arrangement reflects the 9-minute take of "Introduction" more than the title track itself – is featured on their 2016 release Gensho, both as studio and live recordings.

In an interview with Rad Company, drummer Atsuo remarked that the album was recorded on analog tape in one take.

Reception

The album received praise for its cover and use of many distinct genres previously used by the band into a single album. In Mojo, Andrew Male said that the album "sounds like a blueprint for every future Boris release". Pitchfork Media placed Akuma No Uta at number 198 on their list of top 200 albums of the 2000s.

Cover art
While the original minimalist album cover has been part of Boris' website for an extensive period of time, its US cover version is a direct tribute to the cover of Nick Drake's album Bryter Layter. The notable difference in the design is Takeshi holding his double-neck Ibanez instead of the acoustic guitar that Drake holds in his cover. The album's original length was extended on the reissue to 39 minutes, exactly the same length as Bryter Layter.

Southern Lord Records released a vinyl pressing that had a third cover, in tribute to the band Venom. This was released as a picture disc with 700 copies featuring the "Nick Drake" cover, and 300 in the "Venom" style cover.

Track listing

Pressing History

References

External links
 

2003 albums
Southern Lord Records albums
Boris (band) albums